Saengil (literally “birthday”) is a township, or myeon in Wando County, South Jeolla Province, South Korea. The southwestern portion of the town Geumil-eup was separated and newly designated as the township Saengil-myeon in 1989. Saengil Town Office is located in Yuseo-ri, which is crowded with people.

Communities
Saengil-myeon is divided into 3 villages (ri).

References

External links
Official website 

Wando County
Towns and townships in South Jeolla Province